Young Lucrezia (Italian: Lucrezia giovane) is a 1974 Italian historical drama film directed by Luciano Ercoli and starring Simonetta Stefanelli, Massimo Foschi and Ettore Manni.

Cast 
 Simonetta Stefanelli as Lucrezia Borgia
 Massimo Foschi as Cesare Borgia
 Ettore Manni as Rodrigo Borgia / Papa Alessandro VI-Lucrezia's father 
 Anna Orso as Giovanna Cattanei(Vannozza)-Lucrezia's mother 
 Paolo Malco as Juan de Candia Borgia / Duke of Candia-Lucrezia's brother 
 Elizabeth Turner as Giulia / the Pope's lover 
 Fred Robsahm as Alfonso d'Aragona / Lucrezia's husband 
 Raffaele Curi as Perotto / Cesare's lieutenant 
 Aldo Reggiani as Giovanni Sforza / Duke of Pesaro- 
 Piero Lulli as Ludovico Maria Sforza 'il Moro' 
 Teodoro Corrà as Sisto Borgia / Cardinale 
 Edoardo Florio as The Pope's Private Secretary 
 Guglielmo Spoletini as Giaco / Cesare's man 
 Giovanni Petrucci as Cesare's Man 
 Alessandro Perrella as Cesare's Man 
 Vittorio Fanfoni as Tommaso / Alfonso's friend

References

Bibliography 
 Fabio Melelli. Altre storie del cinema italiano. Morlacchi, 2002.

External links 
 

1974 films
Italian erotic drama films
1970s erotic drama films
Italian historical drama films
1970s historical drama films
1970s Italian-language films
Films directed by Luciano Ercoli
Films set in the 16th century
1974 drama films
1970s Italian films